The Botanic Garden silver dollar is a commemorative dollar issued by the United States Mint in 1997.

See also

 List of United States commemorative coins and medals (1990s)
 United States commemorative coins

References

1997 establishments in the United States
Modern United States commemorative coins